Hydrocanthus atripennis is a species of burrowing water beetle in the family Noteridae. It is found in North America.

References

Further reading

External links

 

Noteridae
Articles created by Qbugbot
Beetles described in 1834